Palkanlu-ye Pain (also Romanized as Pālkānlū-ye Pā’īn; also known as Pālkānlū-ye Soflá) is a village in Jirestan Rural District, Sarhad District, Shirvan County, North Khorasan Province, Iran. At the 2006 census, its population was 403, in 91 families.

References 

Populated places in Shirvan County